Lepturobosca is a genus of longhorned beetles in the family Cerambycidae.

Species
These three species are members of the genus Lepturobosca:
 Lepturobosca chrysocoma (Kirby in Richardson, 1837)
 Lepturobosca nigrolineata (Bland, 1865)
 Lepturobosca virens  (Linnaeus, 1758)

References

Lepturinae